The 1914 Illinois Fighting Illini football team was an American football team that represented the University of Illinois in the Western Conference during the 1914 college football season. In their second season under head coach Robert Zuppke, the Fighting Illini compiled a 7–0 record (6–0 against conference opponents), shut out four of seven opponents, and outscored all opponents by a total of 224 to 22.

There was no contemporaneous system in 1914 for determining a national champion. However, Illinois was retroactively named as the national champion by the Billingsley Report and as a co-national champion by Parke H. Davis. Army was chosen as co-champion by Davis and as national champion by three other selectors.

End Perry Graves and guard Ralph Chapman were consensus picks for the 1914 All-America college football team. Chapman was the team captain. Seven Illini players were also honored on the 1914 All-Western Conference football team selected by Walter Eckersall: quarterback Potsy Clark (first teaam); halfbacks Harold Pogue (first team); ends George K. Squier (first team) and Perry Graves (second team); guard Ralph Chapman (first team); fullback Eugene Schobinger (second team); and tackle Lennox F. Armstrtong (second team).

Schedule

Roster 

Head Coach: Robert Zuppke (second year at Illinois)

Awards and honors 
Perry Graves, end
 Consensus first-team selection on the 1914 College Football All-America Team
Ralph Chapman, guard
 Consensus first-team selection on the 1914 All-America team
 Lennox F. Armstrong, tackle
 Third-team All-American selection by Frank G. Menke, sporting editor of the International News Service
Potsy Clark
 Third-team All-American selection by Frank G. Menke
 Outing magazine's "Football Roll of Honor: The Men Whom the Best Coaches of the Country Have Named as the Stars of the Gridiron in 1914"
Harold Pogue, halfback
 First-team selection by Fred M. Walker of the Pittsburgh Gazette-Times and The Michigan Daily for the 1914 All-America team
 Second-team selection by Walter Eckersall for the 1914 All-America team of the Chicago Tribune
 Third-team selection by Walter Camp and Frank G. Menke for the 1914 All-America team
 Outing magazine's "Football Roll of Honor"

References

Illinois
Illinois Fighting Illini football seasons
College football national champions
Big Ten Conference football champion seasons
Illinois Fighting Illini football